Elections to the Labour Party's Shadow Cabinet (more formally, its "Parliamentary Committee") occurred on 14 June 1979, following the Party's fall from power at the May general election that year. In addition to the 12 members elected, the Leader (James Callaghan), Deputy Leader (Michael Foot), Labour Chief Whip (Michael Cocks), Labour Leader in the House of Lords (Lord Peart), and Chairman of the Parliamentary Labour Party (Fred Willey) were automatically members.

Tony Benn, who had been Secretary of State for Energy in the outgoing Callaghan ministry did not seek election to the Shadow Cabinet as he opted to return to the back benches "for the time being".

The 12 winners of the election are listed below:

References

1979
Labour Party Shadow Cabinet election
Labour Party (UK) Shadow Cabinet election